PeaceKeeper Cause-Metics is a cosmetics company with a line of products for which all profits, after taxes, are used to support women's health advocacy and human rights issues, while educating the mass consumer about many issues within the Human Rights field.  The Company, Wisdom Says, was registered by CEO Jody Weiss as a S-Corporation in the State of California in May 1999.  Wisdom Says registered the name "PeaceKeeper" as a trademark in February 2001 stating that "the very act of buying a product for which all profits support women's health advocacy & urgent human rights issues would transform the buyer into a PeaceKeeper herself".  The company is currently holding a Kiss Campaign to raise money for women and girls who have left indentured servitude and sex trafficking.  Weiss says "The ethos behind the company is to invite women to be proactive, to use their discretionary income to make spending decisions that contribute directly to promoting gender equality
and ending violence".

References 

Cosmetics companies of the United States